St. Elizabeth High School was a private, Roman Catholic high school in Oakland, California, established in 1921 by the Franciscan Friars.  It was located in the Roman Catholic Diocese of Oakland. It closed in 2017 and reopened on August 15, 2018, as Cristo Rey De La Salle East Bay High School.

Notes and references

External links
School website

Catholic secondary schools in California
Educational institutions established in 1921
High schools in Oakland, California
1921 establishments in California